Austrocochlea rudis, common name the rough periwinkle or the roughened austrocochlea, is a species of sea snail, a marine gastropod mollusk in the family Trochidae, the top snails.

Description
The imperforate shell has an orbiculate-conical shape. The blunt spire shows transversal black lines and oblique longitudinal striae. The columella is subtuberculate. The smooth lip is black and within  with a golden yellow margin.

Distribution
This marine species is endemic to Australia and occurs off South Australia and Western Australia

References

 Menke, C.T. 1843. Molluscorum Novae Hollandiae Specimen in Libraria Aulica Hahniana. Hannover : Hahniana 46 pp
 Philippi, R.A. 1849. Centuria altera Testaceorum novorum. Zeitschrift für Malakozoologie 5: 99-112 
 Adams, A. 1853. Contributions towards a monograph of the Trochidae, a family of gastropodous Mollusca. Proceedings of the Zoological Society of London 1851(19): 150-192
 Philippi, R.A. 1855. Trochidae. pp. 313–372 in Küster, H.C. (ed). Systematisches Conchylien-Cabinet von Martini und Chemnitz. Nürnberg : Bauer & Raspe Vol. 2
 Tate, R. 1879. Zoologica et Palaeontologica Miscellanea, chiefly relating to South Australia. Transactions of the Philosophical Society of Adelaide 1878-79: 129-140 
 Tate, R. & May, W.L. 1901. A revised census of the marine Mollusca of Tasmania. Proceedings of the Linnean Society of New South Wales 26(3): 344-471 
 Iredale, T. 1915. A commentary on Suter's "Manual of the New Zealand Mollusca". Transactions of the New Zealand Institute 47: 417-497 
 Hedley, C. 1916. A preliminary index of the Mollusca of Western Australia. Journal and Proceedings of the Royal Society of Western Australia 1: 152-226 
 Cotton, B.C. & Godfrey, F.K. 1934. South Australian Shells. Part 13. South Australian Naturalist 1 16: 1-6 
 Cotton, B.C. 1959. South Australian Mollusca. Archaeogastropoda. Handbook of the Flora and Fauna of South Australia. Adelaide : South Australian Government Printer 449 pp
 Wilson, B. 1993. Australian Marine Shells. Prosobranch Gastropods. Kallaroo, Western Australia : Odyssey Publishing Vol. 1 408 pp

External links
 To Barcode of Life (1 barcode)
 To Encyclopedia of Life
 To GenBank (5 nucleotides; 2 proteins)
 To USNM Invertebrate Zoology Mollusca Collection
 To World Register of Marine Species

rudis
Gastropods of Australia
Gastropods described in 1826